Heidi Jacobs may refer to:

 Heidi Hayes Jacobs (born 1948), author and education leader
 Heidi L. M. Jacobs, Canadian writer